Robert Antony Hayward, Baron Hayward,  (born 11 March 1949) is a British Conservative Party politician and media commentator.

Early life
Hayward was educated at Abingdon School and Maidenhead Grammar School, where he was Head Boy. He won a scholarship to study Economics (Honours) at the University of Rhodesia. He served as National Vice-Chairman of the Young Conservatives from 1976 to 1977 and was a councillor on Coventry City Council from 1976 to 1978.

Parliamentary career
Hayward first stood for Parliament, unsuccessfully, at Carmarthen, in October 1974, being beaten by the leader of Plaid Cymru, Gwynfor Evans.

He was the Member of Parliament (MP) for Kingswood from 1983 to 1992. In January 1992 he "talked out" the second reading of the Civil Rights (Disabled Persons) Bill, and had to apologise for misleading the House. He lost his seat in the 1992 general election to Labour's Roger Berry.

In 1993, Hayward was the unsuccessful Conservative candidate at the Christchurch by-election, losing the safe seat by a swing of over 35% to the Liberal Democrat candidate. During the campaign he was targeted by disability rights activists from the Disabled People's Direct Action Network for previously blocking legislation that would have improved disabled people's rights.

During his time in the House of Commons, he served on the Energy Select Committee (1984–85), the Conservative Party's Aviation Committee (1984–92) and as PPS at the Department for Trade & Industry, including to Michael Howard as the then Minister for Corporate & Consumer Affairs.  Hayward was also PPS to Paul Channon, the Secretary of State for Transport, between 1987–89, a period that saw the Lockerbie bombing, Clapham and Kings Cross rail disasters and the Kegworth air crash.

In 1989, Hayward successfully predicted the number of MPs not supporting Margaret Thatcher in the leadership election. In 1990, Hayward conducted similar analysis for the first leadership ballot and the implications of the second.

Prior to the 1992 general election, Hayward correctly forecast a Conservative victory on the basis of an analysis of the opinion polls and election results in 1991 and submitted in a paper written for the Party leadership, including Prime Minister, John Major. Although the term was not coined by Hayward, his paper gave rise to the phrase 'shy Tory'. The paper (and forecast) was referred to in The Sunday Times on 12 April 1992.

Rugby referee 
Throughout his time as an MP, Hayward continued to referee rugby union, having qualified in 1980. Following his election defeat in 1992, he was promoted to national level and officiated at division 3 and 4 and county championship matches.  Hayward refereed the first inter-parliamentary rugby game – between Britain and France in 1991.

Gulf War hostages
Hayward was appointed an Officer of the Order of the British Empire (OBE) for his services to friends and families of hostages prior to the Gulf War in 1991 Iraq War, when he established and ran, with others, the Gulf Support Group for civilians who were held after the invasion of Kuwait by Iraq. This service ran initially from Hayward's home, then from offices in London.

After Parliament
Following his Commons career, in 1994 he became Chief Executive of the British Soft Drinks Association. He then moved to become Chief Executive of the Beer and Pub Association in 1999, a post he held until 2009.

Hayward has been a prominent spokesman on gay and lesbian issues since coming out after leaving parliament, and in 1996 was one of the founding members and first Chairman of the Kings Cross Steelers who successfully competed as the first Gay Rugby Union team in the world. As of 2015, he is currently a Vice-President of the club. Hayward was Recipient of national Rugby Writers Award on 13.1.20 for ‘services to rugby’.

In addition, Hayward was also a board member of Stonewall for seven years and finance chairman from 1999 until 2003.

Hayward stepped down as CEO of the Beer and Pub Association to concentrate on his career as a psephologist and political analyst. He was an advisor to the then-Chairman of the Conservative Party (Eric Pickles MP) and was widely credited with identifying 'motorway man' as a key factor in the 2010 general election.

During 2009/10 he had responsibility for preparing policy for the Conservative Party to reduce the size of the House of Commons. He subsequently worked at Conservative Campaign Headquarters on the Conservative Party's proposals for the abortive 2011–13 boundary review.

Hayward was Deputy Chairman of Central YMCA from 2011 until 2017, and Treasurer of Dignity in Dying from 2012 to 2015. He was also adviser to the board of Terence Higgins Trust and, from 2012 to 2014, a non-executive director of Portcullis Public Affairs. In 2014 Hayward was Presenter of the Business Breakfast Show on Colourful Radio.

It was announced on 15 May 2012 that Robert Hayward would be chairing the government's Public Sector Equality Duty review. This review was completed in September 2013.

In January 2015 he identified that the opinion polls were under-estimating the Conservative vote and over-estimating the Labour vote for the upcoming General Election. The percentage deviations identified were proved to be almost precisely accurate at the election in May. (see London Evening Standard 19.1.15 and The Guardian 20.1.15 etc.). Similarly, he spoke on Newsnight (7.6.16 and several papers 8/9.6.16) and other broadcast media forecasting a leave result at Britain's European referendum.

Return to Parliament
On 27 August 2015 it was announced in the Dissolution Honours List that Hayward would be awarded a life peerage. He was created Baron Hayward, of Cumnor in the County of Oxfordshire, on 28 September 2015.

In June 2016, Hayward sponsored the Assisted Dying Bill 2016–17 in the House of Lords. In 2017, he revealed that he has been living with multiple sclerosis.

In December 2017 and January 2018, Lord Hayward appeared on Sky News and other media channels campaigning against the use of plastic wrapping of fruit and vegetables by supermarkets.

Asked a series of questions supporting the extension of plastic bags charge to all shops- Lords order paper June/July 2019.

'One of the architects of the Westminster Marriage Equality Bill’ -SDLP Autumn Report 2019
‘One half of the Parliamentary odd couple’ with Conor McGinn MP supporting marriage equality in Northern Ireland- Guardian 6th Jan 2019.

Hayward is a media commentator on elections and opinion polls, as well as an election night analyst for LBC in 2017 and TalkRadio in 2019.

See also
 List of Old Abingdonians

References

Sources 
The Times Guide to the House of Commons, Times Newspapers Ltd, 1983
The Times Guide to the House of Commons, Times Newspapers Ltd, 1992
Almamac of British Politics (1999)

External links 
 

1949 births
Living people
People educated at Hampton School
People educated at Abingdon School
Conservative Party (UK) life peers
Life peers created by Elizabeth II
Conservative Party (UK) MPs for English constituencies
UK MPs 1983–1987
UK MPs 1987–1992
Officers of the Order of the British Empire
Gay politicians
English LGBT politicians
LGBT life peers
Coventry City Councillors
Conservative Party (UK) councillors
LGBT members of the Parliament of the United Kingdom
University of Zimbabwe alumni